Mordellistena curteapicalis is a beetle in the genus Mordellistena of the family Mordellidae. It was described in 1926 by Pic.

References

curteapicalis
Beetles described in 1926